The Johannes Goldade House near Linton, North Dakota, United States, was built in 1890. The house is representative of the architecture of the Black Sea Germans who immigrated from a region of the Russian Empire that is now located in southern Ukraine. It was listed on the National Register of Historic Places in 1983, and was delisted in 2016.  The listing included two contributing buildings and one contributing structure.

References

Houses in Emmons County, North Dakota
German-Russian culture in North Dakota
Houses on the National Register of Historic Places in North Dakota
Houses completed in 1890
Ukrainian-American culture in North Dakota
National Register of Historic Places in Emmons County, North Dakota
Former National Register of Historic Places in North Dakota
1890 establishments in North Dakota